Since April 2021, 34 cockfight enthusiasts or players (locally called sabungeros) have disappeared in different areas of Luzon in the Philippines. Out of the missing, 19 are from Laguna, six are from Manila, six are from Batangas, and two are from Bulacan. One of them from Laguna was confirmed to have been kidnapped.

Disappearances 
The first known documented disappearance was reported on April 28, 2021, when two men were seen escorted one of the disappeared, identified as Michael Bautista, while in handcuffs in Santa Cruz, Laguna.

A cellphone video captured on May 11, 2021, showing the last moments of the two cockfight enthusiasts before their disappearance in Santa Cruz, Laguna.

A CCTV footage dated August 30, 2021, showing a group of men storming the house of 48-year-old Ricardo Lasco in San Pablo, Laguna. Several minutes later, Lasco was seen escorted out of the house, along with a box allegedly containing jewelry, watches, and money, before riding away. Lasco has since not been found. According to his relatives, Lasco was a chicken breeder and a "master agent" of online cockfighting, known locally as e-sabong.

On January 5, 2022, Jeffrey and Nomer Depano from Hagonoy, Bulacan failed to return home after they went to a cockfighting event in Lipa, Batangas. The Depano brothers were in a van, which was later found abandoned two days later near a bridge along MacArthur Highway. The police found their clothes still inside the van. According to their parents, Jeffrey was only brought along by Nomer due to a lack of players at the event, despite the former having no prior experience in cockfighting. On January 6, also in Hagonoy, three other residents, Edgar Malaca, Alexander Quijano, and Atong Sacdalan were reportedly missing after telling their respective families that they were going to Lipa, supposedly to attend an online sabong event.

On January 13, 2022, four cockfighting players went missing from the Manila Arena, followed by six more players from the same area. CCTV footage dated the same day showed a convoy of vehicles driving away from the Manila Arena in Santa Ana, Manila. One vehicle spotted in the convoy was a Toyota Tamaraw FX ridden by the neighbors of a cockfight player who went missing in Rizal. The FX stopped at Osmeña Highway, where an unknown man was seen getting out of the car and transferring to the tailing car. One day after the disappearances of some of the cockfight players in Laguna, an unidentified man was captured on a CCTV camera withdrawing the money using the ATM card of one of the disappeared. The wife of ATM card owner said that more than P29,000 was stolen from the husband's ATM card. A concerned person offered a reward of P250,000 for those who could provide the man's identity.

A luxury car used to transport the cockfight enthusiasts was found abandoned on February 4, 2022, in a restaurant in Malate, Manila. The car reportedly still had its engine running. Police investigators looked into the incident as a possible kidnapping, but could not find any evidence.

Investigations 
On February 8, 2022, the Philippine National Police stated that they identified multiple persons of interest in connection to the missing cockfight enthusiasts. The police said that the investigators talked to the cockfight arena managers and the security guards before the disappearance took place. The investigators eyed match fixing and double crossing as the cause of the disappearances.

On February 17, 2022, Department of Justice Secretary Menardo Guevarra ordered the National Bureau of Investigation to investigate the disappearance of over 20 sabungeros.

On February 28, 2022, the Philippine Senate Committee on Public Order and Dangerous Drugs, chaired by Senator Ronald dela Rosa, filed Senate Resolution No. 996, urging the Philippine Amusement and Gaming Corporation (PAGCOR) to suspend the operation of e-sabong.

On February 25, 2022, a social media post claimed that the bodies of alleged missing cockfight enthusiasts were found in Tanay, Rizal. However, the police debunked the claim, proving that the images were taken on February 12, when the police investigated an ambush in Guindulungan, Maguindanao. The police have also condemned the post as misinformation in an attempt to derail their investigation.

The sibling of one of the missing sabungeros, Ricardo Lasco Jr. stated that the armed men on August 30, 2021, identified themselves as agents of the NBI. The men presented an arrest warrant and refused to identify themselves, explaining that Lasco was charged for "large scale estafa". According to San Pablo City Chief of Police Gary Alegre, the NBI did not conduct an operation on that day. Dela Rosa suggests that e-sabong "website cloning" or spoofing, could be a possible cause for Lasco's disappearance. At least two police officers were implicated in abduction of Lasco in Laguna but both denied their involvement.

On March 16, 2022, the police identified eight people involved in the disappearances.

On March 21, 2022, witnesses implicated businessman Atong Ang in the disappearances of the cockfight players. Ang, however, denied the allegations against him.

On October 8, the authorities said that they traced the location of cellphones of two of the disappeared, through the IMEI; the police did not publicly disclose the location. The CIDG released the composite sketch of the two men. The next day, the family of Bautista filed a complaints for kidnapping and serious illegal detention against a farm manager and a security officer.

On December 19, 2022, the DOJ announced that they will indict three police officers namely S/Sgt. Daryl Paghangaan, Patrolmen Roy Navarete and Rigel Brosas  in connection of robbery and kidnapping of Richard Lasco on August 30, 2021.

On February 13, 2023, the police released the photos of six Manila Arena security guards allegedly involved in the disappearances. Justice Secretary Jesus Crispin Remulla offered a P6-million reward to anyone who could provide information of the said suspects.

Reactions 
On January 31, 2022, the relatives of 18 sabungeros held a protest along Mendiola Street in Manila, calling the government to speed up the investigation. On February 12, 2022, Senator Leila de Lima expressed concern over the missing cockfight players, and also lamented for "seemingly slow pace of investigation". Three days later, the relatives of missing cockfight enthusiasts held a prayer vigil in front of the Commission of Human Rights.

On March 17, Philippine President Rodrigo Duterte lamented the possibility that the missing 36 sabungeros are "dead". Dela Rosa also stated that the missing sabungeros are presumed dead due to the lack of any recovered remains. Duterte also rejected the earlier appeal of the Senate to suspend e-sabong operations, stating that it would lose the Philippine government approximately  million (12.15 million US dollars) in revenue, adding up to billions of pesos in a year. He noted that the disappearances of the sabungeros are not the fault of the e-sabong event management, but of bad actors involved in e-sabong events.

On May 4, 2022, Duterte ordered the termination of e-sabong operations as a result of social cost caused by the gambling activity.

See also
List of kidnappings
List of people who disappeared

References 

2020s missing person cases
2021 crimes in the Philippines
2022 crimes in the Philippines
Cockfighting
Missing person cases in the Philippines
Kidnapped people
Online gambling